Simpson "Skip" Brown, Jr. (born January 21, 1955) is an American former college basketball player and an assistant athletic director at Wake Forest University.  Brown was also an All-American player at Wake Forest.

Brown, a 6'0" point guard from Dobyns-Bennett High School in Kingsport, Tennessee, played college basketball at Wake Forest.  While there, he became one of the school's best all-time players.  As a sophomore, Brown averaged 22.7 points and 6.8 assists per game and was named first team All-Atlantic Coast Conference (ACC).  As a senior, Brown again made first team All-ACC as he averaged 18.6 points and 6.2 assists per game and led the Demon Deacons to the Midwest Regional final of the 1977 NCAA Tournament, where they lost to eventual champion Marquette.  In his career, Brown scored 2,034 points and in 1998 his number was retired by Wake Forest.

After graduation, Brown was drafted in the third round (56th pick overall) of the 1977 NBA draft by the Boston Celtics.  When he did not make the team's final roster, he focused his attention on a career in banking, although in 1978 he did play a few games for the Winston-Salem franchise of the now defunct All-American Basketball Alliance professional league before they folded.  After a long career at Bank of America, he co-founded and served as president of TriStone Community Bank and later First Community Bank.

In September, 2013, Brown was hired as assistant athletic director for student-athlete development and operations finance at his alma mater, Wake Forest.

References

1955 births
Living people
American bank presidents
American men's basketball players
Basketball players from Tennessee
Boston Celtics draft picks
People from Kingsport, Tennessee
Point guards
Wake Forest Demon Deacons men's basketball players